Oakland Township is located in Schuyler County, Illinois. As of the 2010 census, its population was 135 and it contained 95 housing units.

Geography

Demographics

References

External links
City-data.com
Illinois State Archives

Townships in Schuyler County, Illinois
Townships in Illinois